Dienheim is an Ortsgemeinde – a municipality belonging to a Verbandsgemeinde, a kind of collective municipality – in the Mainz-Bingen district in Rhineland-Palatinate, Germany.

Geography

Location 
Dienheim lies between Mainz and Worms, in Rhenish Hesse. The winemaking centre belongs to the Verbandsgemeinde Rhein-Selz, whose seat is in Oppenheim.

History 
In the 8th century, Dienheim had its first documentary mention. The village passed in Charlemagne’s time to the Fulda Abbey. Later it ended up as an Imperial pledge in Electoral Palatinate’s ownership.

Dienheim is mentioned in the Wormser wall-building ordinance from around 900 as one of the places that shared responsibility for maintaining the city wall of Worms.

From the early 13th century, the Barons of Dienheim are witnessed, later, from the 16th to 18th century, being assigned to the Rhenish Knightly District’s (Rheinischer Ritterkreis) canton of Oberrheinstrom.

Politics

Town council 
The council is made up of 17 council members, counting the part-time mayor, with seats apportioned thus:

(as at municipal election held on 13 June 2004)

Coat of arms 
The municipality's arms might be described thus: Per pale sable and argent a lion rampant Or armed gules and a cross of the first.

Town partnerships 
  Sours, Eure-et-Loir, France since 1977

Economy and infrastructure

Transport

Highways 
The municipality lies on Bundesstraße 9 linking Mainz with Worms. Since December 2007, the B 9, which had until then run through the built-up area, has run instead along a bypass alongside the railway line.

The Autobahnen A 60 and A 63 can each be reached in roughly 20 minutes.

Local public transport 
Once the Mainz-Ludwigshafen railway line is integrated into the RheinNeckar S-Bahn in 2015, there will be a stop somewhere near the sporting ground.

References

External links 

Municipality’s official webpage 

Municipalities in Rhineland-Palatinate
Rhenish Hesse
Mainz-Bingen